Thomas John Morgan may refer to:

 Thomas J. Morgan (1847–1912), English-American labor leader
 T. J. Morgan (1907–1986), Welsh academic

See also
 Thomas Morgan (disambiguation)